Mario Benedetti Farrugia (14 September 1920 – 17 May 2009), was an Uruguayan journalist, novelist, and poet and an integral member of the Generación del 45. Despite publishing more than 80 books and being published in twenty languages he was not well known in the English-speaking world. In the Spanish-speaking world he is considered one of Latin America's most important writers of the latter half of the 20th century.

Early life and education
Benedetti was born 1920 in Paso de los Toros in the Uruguayan Tacuarembó Department to Brenno Benedetti, a pharmaceutical and chemical winemaker and Matilde Farrugia who were of Italian descent. Two years later, they moved to  Tacuarembó, the capital city of the province, and shortly after that, his father tried to buy a chemist’s but was swindled and went into bankruptcy, so they moved and settled in Montevideo, the capital city of the country, where they lived in difficult economic conditions. Mario completed six years of primary school at the Deutsche Schule  Montevideo, where he also learned German, which later allowed him to be the first translator of Franz Kafka in Uruguay. His father immediately removed him from the school when Nazi ideology started featuring in the classroom. For two years afterwards he studied at Liceo Miranda, but for the rest of his high school years he did not attend an educational institution. In those years he learned shorthand, which was his livelihood for a long time. At the age of 14 he began working, first as a stenographer and then as a seller, public officer, accountant, journalist, broadcaster and translator.

Career
He trained as a journalist with Carlos Quijano, in the weekly Marcha. From 1938 and 1941 he lived in Buenos Aires, Argentina. He worked in different professions on both banks of the Río de la Plata river, for example, as a stenographer. In 1946 he married Luz López Alegre.

He was a member of the 'Generation of 45', an Uruguayan intellectual and literary movement which included Carlos Maggi, Manuel Flores Mora, Ángel Rama, Emir Rodríguez Monegal, Idea Vilariño, Carlos Real de Azúa, José Pedro Díaz, Amanda Berenguer,  Ida Vitale, Líber Falco, Juan Carlos Onetti, among others.

He  wrote for the weekly Uruguayan newspaper Marcha from 1945 until it was forcibly closed by the military government in 1973, and was its literary director from 1954. In 1957, he traveled to Europe and visited nine countries as a correspondent for Marcha weekly magazine and El Diario newspaper.

Exile, 1973 to 1985
For 12 years, from 1973 to 1985, when a civic-military dictatorship ruled Uruguay, Benedetti lived in exile. He first went to Buenos Aires, Argentina, and then to Lima, Peru where he was detained, deported and then given amnesty. He went to Cuba in 1976 and the following year to Madrid, Spain. 
His exile was made particularly trying by the fact that his wife had to remain in Uruguay to look after both of their mothers. In 1980, he moved to Palma, Majorca.

Return to Uruguay, 1985

Benedetti returned to Uruguay in March 1985 following the restoration of democracy, and thereafter divided his time between Montevideo and Madrid.  He has been granted Honoris Causa doctorates by the Universidad de la República, Uruguay, the Universidad de Alicante, Spain and the Universidad de Valladolid, Spain. In 1986 he was awarded Laureate Of The International Botev Prize. On 7 June 2005, he was named the recipient of the Menéndez Pelayo International Prize. His poetry was also used in the 1992 Argentine movie The Dark Side of the Heart (El lado oscuro del corazón) in which he read some of his poems in German.

In 2006, Mario Benedetti signed a petition in support of the independence of Puerto Rico from the United States.

Personal life and death
In the last ten years of his life Benedetti suffered from asthma and spent his winters in Madrid where it was summer in order to avoid the cold, though as his health deteriorated he eventually remained in Montevideo. In 2006, his wife Luz López died, ending more than six decades of matrimony.

Before dying he dictated to his personal secretary, Ariel Silva, what would become his last poem:

He died in Montevideo on 17 May 2009. He had suffered from respiratory and intestinal problems for more than a year. His remains are buried at the National Pantheon in the Central Cemetery of Montevideo.

Work
For his poetry and novels Benedetti won numerous international awards. La Tregua, first published in 1960, has since been translated into over 20 languages (into English by Harry Morales) and inspired the 1974 film The Truce. Each year below links to either the corresponding "[year] in literature" or "[year] in poetry" article:

Poetry
 1945: La víspera indeleble ("Indelible Eve"), his first published book
 1956: Poemas de oficina ("Office Poems")
 1963:
 Inventario, Poesía 1950–1958 ("Inventory, Poems 1950–1958")
 Poemas del hoy por hoy ("Poems of Today")
 1977: La casa y el ladrillo ("The House and the Brick")
 1981: Viento del exilio ("Wind of the exile")
 1986: Preguntas al azar ("Random Questions")
 1988: Yesterday y mañana ("Yesterday and Tomorrow")
 1991: Las soledades de Babel ("The Loneliness of Babel")
 1994: Inventario dos (1985-1994) ("Inventory Two (1985-1994)"), published in Madrid
 1995: ("The Exercise of Discretion: Oblivion Is Full of Memory"), published in Spain
 1996: El amor, las mujeres y la vida. Poemas de amor.
 1997: La vida ese paréntesis
 2002: Insomnios y Duermevelas, 
 2004: Defensa propia, 
 Little Stones At My Window (Bilingual edition; translation and introduction by Charles Hatfield) 
Poemas de otros
Noción de Patria
Sólo mientras tanto
Quemar las naves
A ras de sueño
Letras de emergencia
 2007: Vivir adrede

Short stories
 1960:  Montevideanos
 Aquí se respira bien
 Los pocillos
 Acaso irreparable
 Escrito en Überlingen
 El reino de los cielos
 Miss Amnesia
 "Una carta de amor"
 La noche de los feos
 "La sirena viuda"
 "El buzón del tiempo"
 1977: La vecina orilla

Essays
 1960: El país de la cola de paja
  "La Colección"

Plays
 1958: Ida y Vuelta
 1979: Pedro y el capitán

Novels
 1953: Quién de nosotros
 1960: La tregua, the basis for The Truce (1974 film)
 1965: Gracias por el fuego, the basis for a 1984 film of the same name; see List of Argentine films of 1984
 1971: El cumpleaños de Juan Ángel
 1982: Primavera con una esquina rota
 1993: La borra del café
 1996: Andamios
 2003: El porvenir de mi pasado

Miscellaneous
 1969: Book Cubano, including poems, articles and interviews about Cuba and his experiences there 
 1984: El Desexilio y Otras Conjeturas (Dis-exile And Other Conjectures)
 1996: Obras completas ("Complete Works"), in 28 volumes, published in Argentina

See also

 List of Uruguayan writers
 Eduardo Galeano
 Juan Carlos Onetti
 Daniel Viglietti
 Sergio Renán
 Eliseo Subiela
 Nacha Guevara

References

External links

 Mario Benedetti Foundation (in Spanish)
 Excerpt from "Spring with a Broken Corner" in Guernica Magazine
 Poemas
 Center for Latin American studies Mario Benedetti, Universitat d'Alacant, Spain

1920 births
2009 deaths
People from Paso de los Toros
Uruguayan people of Italian descent
Uruguayan exiles
Uruguayan expatriates in Argentina
Uruguayan expatriates in Cuba
Uruguayan expatriates in Peru
Uruguayan expatriates in Spain
Uruguayan journalists
Uruguayan novelists
Translators of Franz Kafka
Male novelists
Uruguayan essayists
21st-century Uruguayan poets
21st-century Uruguayan male writers
Uruguayan male poets
Uruguayan male short story writers
Uruguayan short story writers
Magic realism writers
Burials at the Central Cemetery of Montevideo
20th-century Uruguayan poets
20th-century novelists
Male essayists
20th-century short story writers
21st-century short story writers
20th-century essayists
21st-century essayists
20th-century Uruguayan male writers
20th-century journalists